Events from the year 1930 in Sweden

Incumbents
 Monarch – Gustaf V
 Prime Minister – Arvid Lindman, Carl Gustaf Ekman

Events
25 November – The Swedish Handball Federation is founded of the Swedish Game Association.

Births

 11 January – Björn von der Esch, politician (died 2010).
 17 January – Ingrid von Rosen, diarist (died 1995)
 23 April – Margareta Ekström, writer.
 17 July – Sigvard Ericsson, speed-skater. 
 15 October – Ingemar Mundebo, politician (died 2018)
 18 November – Sonja Edström, cross country skier.

Deaths

 14 May – Erik Algot Fredriksson, tug-of-war competitor, Olympic champion   (born 1885) . 
 5 June – Eric Lemming, athlete   (born 1880) .
 15 June – Anna Whitlock, reform pedagogue, journalist, suffragette and feminist   (born 1852) 
 12 July - Lotten Edholm, composer and a pioneer within the Swedish Red Cross   (born 1839) 
 25 July - Wilhelmina von Hallwyl, art collector   (born 1844) 
 Undated - 
Joël Blomqvist, hymnwriter (born 1840)
Helene Taube, courtier (born 1860)

References

External links

 
Sweden
Years of the 20th century in Sweden